Valentina Vasilevna Sorokina (27 February 1936 – 11 January 2022) was a Russian pig farmer and stateswoman. A member of the Communist Party, she served in the Supreme Soviet of the Soviet Union from 1971 to 1975. She died on 11 January 2022, at the age of 85.

References

1936 births
2022 deaths
People from Tatarstan
Members of the Supreme Soviet of the Russian Soviet Federative Socialist Republic, 1971–1975
Communist Party of the Soviet Union members
Soviet politicians
Heroes of Socialist Labour
Recipients of the Order of Lenin
Recipients of the Order of the Red Banner of Labour